Herbert Kawainui Kāne (June 21, 1928 – March 8, 2011), considered one of the principal figures in the renaissance of Hawaiian culture in the 1970s, was a celebrated artist-historian and author with a special interest in the seafaring traditions of the ancestral peoples of Hawaii. Kāne played a key role in demonstrating that Hawaiian culture arose not from some accidental seeding of Polynesia, but that Hawaii was reachable by voyaging canoes from Tahiti able to make the journey and return. This offered a far more complex notion of the cultures of the Pacific Islands than had previously been accepted. Furthermore, he created vivid imagery of Hawaiian culture prior to contact with Europeans, and especially the period of early European influence, that sparked appreciation of a nearly forgotten traditional life. He painted dramatic views of war, exemplified by The Battle at Nuuanu Pali, the potential of conflicts between cultures such as in Cook Entering Kealakekua Bay, where British ships are dwarfed and surrounded by Hawaiian canoes, as well as bucolic quotidian scenes and lush images of a robust ceremonial and spiritual life, that helped arouse a latent pride among Hawaiians during a time of general cultural awakening.

Early life and education as an artist
Kāne (kɑh-nay) was born in the community of Marshfield, Minnesota in the United States. His father (also named Herbert) worked in family poi business, and became a paniolo (Hawaiian cowboy), then traveled the US in a Hawaiian band. He later served in the Army and Navy, and had his own practice as a Doctor of Optometry. Herbert Jr.'s grandfather immigrated to Waipio Valley from China and being very industrious, he built the first poi factory in the islands, growing taro and producing poi for market. His mother's family were farmers of Danish ancestry in Wisconsin. Kāne's childhood was divided between Wisconsin and Hawaii. He describes in his book, Voyagers, an early awakening to art. In 1935 he was a barefoot child in Hilo, Hawaii, brought by his mother to the opening of a gallery exhibition of the work of D. Howard Hitchcock. He writes that he was "stunned, confronted with miracles" seeing Hitchcock's work and speaking with him briefly. Hitchcock was the first Hawaiian-born artist to achieve international recognition, and his work focused on unique Hawaiian subject matter, particularly the volcanic eruptions near Hilo. According to his own account, besides this exposure to art and the ongoing encouragement of his parents to pursue his interest in drawing, Kāne's most formative experiences in childhood were in Hawaii, where his father and his family passed along the traditional folk tales of the islands.

Kāne served in the United States Navy, qualifying for veteran's educational benefits under the G.I. Bill. After he was discharged, he used those benefits to attend the School of the Art Institute of Chicago, in Chicago, Illinois, earning a bachelor's degree and, in 1953, a master's degree. Under an arrangement between the two schools at the time, his master's degree was awarded by the University of Chicago.

Early career

Herb had his own advertising studio on Chicago's Michigan Avenue, which is known as "The Magnificent Mile." He was a very successful designer/illustrator/author. His talents were expansive, working with everything from books and magazines, architectural designs, to commercial television work for Kelloggs and various companies, and more. Kāne said he found advertising work unsatisfying. "The end came when I won a Jolly Green Giant campaign, and for a year, did drawings and paintings of that big green fairy until I could no longer suffer it."

Kāne had been sailing a racing catamaran on Lake Michigan, and had begun researching Hawaiian canoes in the library of the University of Chicago and in the Field Museum of Natural History, where in 1961 the museum had installed one of the most extensive collections of artifacts from Pacific Ocean cultures put on view to date. Kāne produced a series of fourteen paintings of Polynesian canoes in the 1960s, which were purchased in 1969 by the Hawaii State Foundation of Culture and the Arts, then headed by its first director, Alfred Preis, architect of the USS Arizona Memorial in Pearl Harbor, Oahu, Hawaii. Kāne has stated that this purchase made it possible for him to move to Hawaii, where he lived in Honolulu and continued his study of Polynesian voyaging canoes.

The Hōkūleʻa and its cultural impact

In Honolulu, Kāne attracted a group of sailing enthusiasts, including University of Hawaii anthropologist Ben Finney and Tommy Holmes, author of The Hawaiian Canoe. Together they founded the Polynesian Voyaging Society and began work on the Hōkūleʻa, a voyaging canoe based on historical Polynesian design, capable of sailing between Hawaii and Tahiti. Their purpose was to prove that ancestral Polynesian voyagers could have purposely navigated in vessels of similar type to settle Hawaii. Kāne has said his goal was also to spur a revival of cultural identity among Hawaiians and peoples of the Pacific islands. He wrote that in 1973 he, with a number of others at the time, realized that "if a voyaging canoe were built and sailed today, it would function as a cultural catalyst and inspire the revival of almost-forgotten aspects of Hawaiian life." 
"What intrigued me was to see, if by building this canoe and putting it to active use and taking it out on a cruise throughout the Hawaiian islands, introducing it to the Hawaiian people, training Hawaiians to sail it, if this would not stimulate shock waves or ripple effect throughout the culture- in music and dance and the crafts. And we know it did."
Kāne designed and named the Hōkūleʻa, which was launched on March 8, 1975. Technically, the craft is a performance-accurate full-scale replica of a waa kaulua, a Polynesian double-hulled voyaging canoe. The name Hōkūleʻa came to Kāne in a dream, he has said. It is the Hawaiian term for the star Arcturus, which is of critical importance to celestial navigation in the Pacific, and the zenith star of the Hawaiian Islands. He served as the skipper for two years as the canoe sailed trial cruises among the Hawaiian Islands to attract crew and support for its maiden international voyage.

Kāne's role in the creation and promotion of the Hōkūleʻa helped restore pride to the peoples of the Pacific, and his paintings of traditional Hawaiian scenes and historical events have helped restore lost identity and, in the words of the President of School of the Art Institute of Chicago, Tony Jones, "rewritten the history of the Pacific." Kāne's colleague, Nainoa Thompson, navigator of the Hōkūleʻa, says Kāne was "the visionary, the dreamer, and he was the architect and the engineer. He's the one that carried the burden of building, and constructing, and sailing Hōkūleʻa." Elsewhere, Thompson told an interviewer, "When you look at Herb's legacy, it is transforming Hawaii's society because he brought pride and culture and inspiration back, through the canoe....He is the father of the Hawaiian Renaissance."

Kāne died on March 8, 2011, the 36th anniversary of the launch of the Hōkūleʻa.

Art works
 Daniel Inouye, United States Senator from Hawaii, has been quoted as saying, "When you saw a Herb Kāne painting, you were energized and motivated to learn about the past. ...His artwork captured both ancient and modern-day Hawaii and help preserve Hawaii's unique culture for future generations." Kāne became one of the most respected figurative painters in Hawaii, with major works on view at the Bishop Museum, the largest museum in the state and the premier natural and cultural history institution in the Pacific. His work has been exhibited at Hawaii Volcanoes National Park, Puukoholā Heiau National Historic Site, and in the Hawaii State Capitol. His paintings of Polynesian sailing have been widely reproduced, appearing as illustrations in books and articles. Among the first of these were a series of seven paintings commissioned by the National Geographic Magazine and published in the December 1974 issue.

His art is characterized by emphasis on realistic and precise draftsmanship when depicting historical scenes, such as his series of voyaging canoe paintings and many other paintings of battles, everyday domestic life, and ceremonial occasions, which are extensively researched. When Kāne turns his imagination to the legends of old Hawaii and the spiritual and mythological side of the Hawaiian culture, his work is more expressionistic, with bold brushwork and vivid colors. His expressionistic style is seen in his painting Pele, Goddess of the Volcano for the Jaggar Museum at Kīlauea, which depicts the supernatural figure with literal fire in her eyes and flowing lava as her hair.

Herb is well known on so many different levels. Most of Herb's art was heavily researched, making sure that everything was historically accurate, even when it came to the weather and cloud coverage at that time in history. He had contacts in Washington, DC, and all around the globe who helped him achieve accuracy in his research. His art was not made by someone simply reaching into the imagination. It was created by an achievement of tireless research and this all adds to the value of his paintings. Herb was the first person to accurately paint Europeans' ships and more. After heavy research in the Maritime Museum in London, Herb had uncovered ship plans that they never even knew they had! He used these for some of his paintings. Herb had also designed some large, magnificently woven tapestries that had the breathtaking beauty of his paintings.

Site-specific works
Kāne's paintings include several very large canvasses or murals for hotel lobbies and similar public and commercial spaces. His 1973 mural, made of wool, titled Opening of the Pacific to Man, was designed for a space above the entrance to the Pacific Trade Center, on Alakea and King Streets in central Honolulu. In the corner of the mural is a representation of the wayfarer's chart, traditionally made of shells and sticks, in which islands and ocean swell patterns are encoded to assist the training of a navigator. As a design consultant, Kāne worked on resorts and visitor centers in Hawaii and the South Pacific, as well as a cultural center in Fiji. Kāne was commissioned by the National Park Service in 1976 to paint "Keoua's Arrival", which is on permanent display in the Visitor Center at Puukoholā Heiau National Historic Site. Several of his large canvasses are on permanent view at the Outrigger Hotel in Waikiki in Honolulu, where the management dedicated the area as a permanent tribute to Kāne.

One 1973 site-specific mural, painted on a custom-designed wall as part of a history center under construction (and never completed) at Punaluu Beach, twice gained notoriety. According to a news report, "The mural shows alii, warriors and commoners on the black sandbar, which separates Punaluu Bay from a pond where springs provide fresh water immediately behind the beach.....A ceiling of thatch gave the feeling of being inside an old Hawaiian shelter and the thatch hid lighting, which gave a natural, daylight look to the mural. Pebbles and sand at the base of the painting met real pebbles and sand on the floor of the history center." In 1975 the mural survived a tsunami that destroyed the interior of the building. According to Kāne's account on his personal blog, quoting eyewitnesses, the wave pushed all the displays out the far side of the room and left a mud line three or four feet high on the wall—except on the mural, which was dry and undamaged. Then in 2005 the mural was stolen from the site, which was vacant and unfinished. Thieves are believed to have cut out the wall in five sections using a circular saw powered by a portable generator, and in this way stole the painting, which has never been recovered. Kāne responded by recreating a version of the mural in oil paint on canvas, saying, "Now all the thieves have is a preliminary sketch. Vengeance is mine."

Stamps

Kāne's work on a much smaller scale reveals his artistic versatility. Kāne designed seven postage stamps for the U.S. Postal Service including stamps commemorating each of the 25th and the 50th anniversaries of Hawaiian statehood. His 1984 stamp for the 25th anniversary of Hawaiian statehood depicts a double-hulled voyaging canoe, a Pacific golden plover (a migratory bird which winters in Hawaii), and a volcano erupting on the flank of Mauna Loa, on the Big Island of Hawaii. On the day of its release, sales of this stamp set a new record for the U.S. Postal Service. His 2009 stamp for the State's 50th anniversary depicts a person surfing and people paddling a traditional outrigger canoe, all riding the same wave. This stamp engendered some controversy, as Kāne was highly critical of the typography in the final design, which he felt mistakenly substituted an apostrophe for the symbol that signals a glottal stop in the word Hawaii and is known by the term okina. He also designed postage stamps for several Pacific island nations, including French Polynesia, the Federated States of Micronesia, as well as the Republic of the Marshall Islands.

Three-dimensional art
Although best known for his paintings, Kāne also produced limited-edition bronze sculpture and other three-dimensional works besides the Hōkūleʻa, which has been called his moving sculpture. His monumental bronze figure, The Young Kamehameha stands in Wailea, Maui.

Last commission

Kāne's last commissioned work was for the Royal Hawaiian Hotel, a wall sized painting of Kamehameha I's landing in Oahu. His health declined and he passed before the work could be completed; however, he had left instructions that, should he die before the work was finished, he wished Brook Kapūkuniahi Parker to complete the work. Eventually the hotel decided to display the work unfinished.

Publications
Kāne communicated his message of the importance of Hawaiian culture and its origins, in print (as author, publisher, and illustrator) and television. Kāne is the author of several books, including:

 Canoes of Polynesia (1974) (portfolio of 12 lithographs with accompanying booklet)

 Voyage, the Discovery of Hawaii (1976)

 A Canoe Helps Hawaii Recapture Her Past in National Geographic Magazine, April, 1976

 Pele, Goddess of Volcanoes (1987)

 Voyagers (1991, 2nd edition 2006)

 Ancient Hawaii (1997)

Kāne is illustrator of:

 The Life and Times of John Young: Confidant and Advisor to Kamehameha the Great

 The Power of the Stone: A Hawaiian Ghost Story

 Christmas Time with Eddie Kamae and the Sons of Hawaii (1977 album cover: Hawaii Sons HS-4004)

 Voyagers, The First Hawaiians (film directed and scored by Paul Csige, based on the 1976 book Voyage, The Discovery of Hawaii by Herb Kāne)

Online interviews include:

 Never Lost: Polynesian Navigation (The Offering)

 Ask the Experts: Herb Kawainui Kāne (The Wayfinders: A Pacific Odyssey) Kāne served as a member of the advisory panel for the 1998 independent film, The Wayfinders: A Pacific Odyssey, which was broadcast widely on television stations including those of the U.S. Public Broadcasting System.

Honors
 1984—Named a Living Treasure of Hawaii by the Honpa Hongwanji Mission of Honolulu
 1987 —One of 16 chosen as Pookela (Champion) for the Year of the Hawaiian Celebration
 1988–1992 – A founding trustee of the Native Hawaiian Culture & Arts Program, Bishop Museum
 1998 – Awarded Bishop Museum's Charles Reed Bishop Medal
 2002 – Received an award for excellence from The Hawaii Book Publishers Association
 2008 – Awarded an honorary Doctorate of Fine Arts by the School of the Art Institute of Chicago

References

External links
Television interview with Nainoa Thompson

Herbert K. Kane Family Trust

1928 births
2011 deaths
Hawaii (island)
Artists from Hawaii
Historians of Hawaii
Hōkūlea
Native Hawaiian writers
Polynesian navigation
School of the Art Institute of Chicago alumni
University of Chicago alumni
Writers from Hawaii